The 2020 Glynhill Ladies International was held January 16 to 19, 2020 at the Braehead Curling Rink in Renfrew, Glasgow, Scotland as a part of the 2019–20 curling season. The event was held in a round robin format with the top eight teams advancing to the playoffs and the bottom eight teams going to the consolation round. The purse for the event was £ 10,600.

In the final, Team Kim Eun-jung of Korea capped off a perfect 6–0 tournament by defeating Team Isabella Wranå of Sweden 8–3 in the final. In the consolation final, Selina Witschonke of Switzerland topped Maggie Wilson of Scotland 5–4. To reach the final, Kim defeated Team Binia Feltscher of Switzerland 8–7 in one semifinal and Wranå beat Team Anna Sidorova of Russia by the same score in the other.

Teams
The teams are listed as follows:

Round-robin standings
Final round-robin standings

Round-robin results
All draw times are listed in Greenwich Mean Time (UTC+00:00).

Draw 1
Thursday, January 16, 7:00 pm

Draw 2
Friday, January 17, 9:00 am

Draw 3
Friday, January 17, 12:30 pm

Draw 4
Friday, January 17, 4:00 pm

Draw 5
Saturday, January 18, 9:00 am

Draw 6
Saturday, January 18, 12:30 pm

Playoffs

Source:

Quarterfinals
Saturday, January 18, 4:00 pm

Semifinals
Sunday, January 19, 11:30 am

Final
Sunday, January 19, 2:30 pm

Consolation

Source:

Quarterfinals
Sunday, January 19, 8:30 am

Semifinals
Sunday, January 19, 11:30 am

Final
Sunday, January 19, 2:30 pm

References

External links
Event Home

2020 in women's curling
International sports competitions in Glasgow
Women's curling competitions in Scotland
Glynhill Ladies International
Sport in Glasgow
2020 in Scottish women's sport